El-Qanah Football Club, also known as Suez Canal, is an Egyptian football club based in Ismailia, Egypt. The club is currently playing in the Egyptian Second Division, the second-highest league in the Egyptian football league system.

History
The club was founded in 1935 as a group of Ismailia born contractors formed a football team calling it "Badran Club", that team included Ismail Abougrisha, Mohamed Abougrisha, Sayed Hamed, Darwish Othman and Ibrahim Al-Samalouty which took part in the Canal Region league with the likes of Ismaily, Masry Port Said, The Greek club, Port Fouad.

In 1948 the club members succeeded to convince the board of the Suez Canal company to merge the Badran club with the company to form "El Qanah" with the Frenchman Paul Blan as a president to take part in the league.

The team promoted to the Egyptian Premier League on the 1953–54 season, and played for 27 seasons on the top flight.

Former players

  Ally Badru - played for Zanzibar national team

Titles
Egypt Cup: (1)
1963–64

Egyptian League Cup: (1) (Record)
2000

Notes

References

Egyptian Second Division
Football clubs in Egypt